Sobey, Sobeys, or variation, may refer to:

People
 Sobey Martin (1909–1978), an American director of television and short films

Surnamed
 Frank H. Sobey (1902–1985), a Canadian businessman and CEO of Sobey's
 John W. Sobey, founder of Sobey's and father to Frank Sobey
 Lianne Sobey, a Canadian curler from New Brunswick
 Nathan Sobey (born 1990), an Australian basketball player

Places
 14719 Sobey, an asteroid, named after DYSC awardee Glen Sobey
 Sobey School of Business, a business school in Halifax, Canada

Other uses
 Sobeys, a Canadian retailer and supermarket conglomerate
 Sobey Foundation, an improvement foundation founded by Frank Sobey
 Sobey Art Foundation, an art foundation founded by Frank Sobey
 Sobey Art Award, Canada's largest prize for young Canadian artists
 Sobeys Slam, a former Grand Slam event of the Women's World Curling Tour, held in New Glasgow, Canada

See also

 Sobeys Stores Ltd v Yeomans, a Canadian legal case from 1989
 Sobey Wall of Honour, Canadian Museum of Immigration, Pier 21, Halifax, Nova Sctoia, Canada